Team rosters for the 2008 Claxton Shield

Australia Provincial

Player Roster

New South Wales Patriots

Player Roster

Perth Heat

Player Roster

Queensland Rams

Player Roster

South Australia

Player Roster

Victoria Aces

Player Roster

External links
Official Baseball Australia Website
Official 2008 Claxton Shield Website

Team